Gustav Ferdinand Mehler, or Ferdinand Gustav Mehler (13 December 1835, in Schönlanke, Kingdom of Prussia – 13 July 1895, in Elbing, German Empire) was a German mathematician.

He is credited with introducing  Mehler's formula; the Mehler–Fock transform;  the Mehler–Heine formula; and Mehler functions (conical functions), in connection with his utilization of Zonal spherical functions in Electromagnetic theory.

References

19th-century German mathematicians
1835 births
1895 deaths